Fundeni may refer to several places in Romania:

 Fundeni, Bucharest, a neighbourhood in Bucharest
 Fundeni Lake, a lake in Bucharest
 Fundeni, Călărași, a commune
 Fundeni, Galați, a commune
 Fundeni, a village in Secuieni, Bacău
 Fundeni, a village in Zărneşti Commune, Buzău County
 Fundeni, a village in Dobroieşti Commune, Ilfov County
 Fundeni, a village in Gura Vitioarei Commune, Prahova County

See also 
 Fundătura (disambiguation)
 Fundoaia (disambiguation)
 Fundata